Brossard—Saint-Lambert is a federal electoral district in Quebec, Canada, that has been represented in the House of Commons of Canada since 2015. It encompasses a portion of Quebec formerly included in the electoral districts of Brossard—La Prairie and Saint-Lambert.

Brossard—Saint-Lambert was created by the 2012 federal electoral boundaries redistribution and was legally defined in the 2013 representation order. It came into effect upon the call of the 42nd Canadian federal election, scheduled for 19 October 2015.

Profile
Brossard—Saint-Lambert is a fairly diverse riding, especially for Montreal's South Shore. The riding has one of the strongest Chinese communities in Quebec, concentrated in Brossard. In addition to this, Brossard—Saint-Lambert has one of the stronger Anglophone communities on the South Shore of Montreal. This riding, and its predecessor, has traditionally been a Liberal bastion of support and they reclaimed it from the NDP following the 2015 federal election.

The Liberals are slightly stronger in Brossard than in Saint-Lambert, while the opposite is true for the Bloc Québécois. Due to their recent large margins of victory in the past three elections (2015, 2019, 2021), this difference in support levels is not particularly apparent, as the Liberals have carried all or almost all polls in the riding.

Demographics
According to the Canada 2016 Census

 Languages: (2016) 52.5% French, 12.3% English, 4.9% Cantonese, 4.6% Spanish, 4.4% Mandarin, 4.3% Arabic, 2.1% Persian, 1.5% Vietnamese, 1.4% Romanian, 1.3% Greek, 1.0% Creole, 1.0% Portuguese, 0.9% Italian, 0.8% Russian, 0.6% Urdu, 0.4% Bulgarian, 0.4% Bengali, 0.4% Polish

Member of Parliament

This riding has elected the following Member of Parliament:

Election results

References

Quebec federal electoral districts
Politics of Brossard
Saint-Lambert, Quebec